The demographics of Thailand paint a statistical portrait of the national population. Demography includes such measures as population density and distribution, ethnicity, educational levels, public health metrics, fertility, economic status, religious affiliation, and other characteristics of the populace.

Population 

The  population of Thailand was estimated to be .

Thailand's population is mostly rural. It is concentrated in the rice growing areas of the central, northeastern, and northern regions. Its urban population—principally in greater Bangkok—was 45.7 percent of the total population in 2010 according to National Economic and Social Development Board (NESDB). Accurate statistics are difficult to arrive at, as millions of Thai migrate from rural areas to cities, then return to their place of origin to help with seasonal field work. Officially they have rural residency, but spend most of the year in urban areas.

Thailand's successful government-sponsored family planning program has resulted in a decline in population growth from 3.1 percent in 1960 to around 0.4 percent in 2015. The World Bank forecasts a contraction of the working-age population of about 10 percent between 2010 and 2040. In 1970, an average of 5.7 people lived in a Thai household. At the time of the 2010 census, the figure was down to 3.2. Even though Thailand has one of the better social security systems in Asia, the increasing population of elderly people is a challenge for the country.

Life expectancy has risen, a reflection of Thailand's efforts to implement effective public health policies. The Thai AIDS epidemic had a major impact on the Thai population. Today, over 700,000 Thai are HIV or AIDS positive, approximately two percent of adult men and 1.5 percent of adult women. Every year, 30,000–50,000 Thai die from HIV or AIDS-related illnesses. Ninety percent of them are ages 20–24, the youngest range of the workforce. An aggressive public education campaign begun in the early-1990s reduced the number of new HIV infections from 150,000 to under 10,000 annually.
The leading cause of death among the age cohort under 15 years of age: drowning. A study by the Child Safety Promotion and Injury Prevention Centre of Ramathibodi Hospital revealed that more than 1,400 youths under 15 years old died from drowning each year, or an average four deaths a day, becoming the top cause of deaths of children, even exceeding that of motorbike deaths. Thailand's Disease Control Department estimates that only 23 percent of Thai children under 15 can swim. The Public Health Ministry said that from 2006 to 2015, 10,923 children drowned. Of the 8.3 million children aged 5–14 nationwide, only two million can swim, according to the Public Health Ministry.

The United Nations classifies Thailand as an "aging society" (one-tenth of the population above 60), on track to become an "aged society" (one-fifth of the population above 60) by 2025. The Fiscal Policy Office projects that the number of Thais aged 60-plus will increase from 14 percent in 2016 to 17.5 percent in 2020, 21.2 percent in 2025, and 25.2 percent in 2030.  it is estimated that there are 94,000 employees aged 60 years or more in the workforce.

Ethnic groups 

Thailand's ethnic origins are diverse and continue to evolve. The nation's ethnic makeup is obscured by the pressures of Thaification, Thai nationalism, and social pressure, which is intertwined with a caste-like mentality assigning some groups higher social status than others. In its report to the United Nations for the International Convention on the Elimination of All Forms of Racial Discrimination, the Thai government officially recognized 62 ethnic communities. Twenty million Central Thai (together with approximately 650,000 Khorat Thai) make up approximately 20,650,000 million (34.1 percent) of the nation's population of 60,544,937 at the time of completion of the Mahidol University Ethnolinguistic Maps of Thailand data (1997).

Thailand's report to the UN provided population numbers for mountain peoples and ethnic communities in the northeast. Thus, though over 3.288 million people in the northeast alone could not be categorised, the population and percentages of other ethnic communities c. 1997 are known and constitute minimum populations. In descending order, the largest (equal to or greater than 400,000) are a) 15,080,000 Lao (24.9 percent) consisting of the Thai Lao (14 million) and other smaller Lao groups, namely the Thai Loei (400-500,000), Lao Lom (350,000), Lao Wiang/Klang (200,000), Lao Khrang (90,000), Lao Ngaew (30,000), and Lao Ti (10,000); b) six million Khon Muang (9.9 percent, also called Northern Thais); c) 4.5 million Pak Tai (7.5 percent, also called Southern Thais); d) 1.4 million Khmer Leu (2.3 percent, also called Northern Khmer); e) 900,000 Malay (1.5%); f) 500,000 Nyaw (0.8 percent); g) 470,000 Phu Thai (0.8 percent); h) 400,000 Kuy/Kuay (also known as Suay) (0.7 percent), and i) 350,000 Karen (0.6 percent).

Thailand's Ministry of Social Development and Human Security's 2015 Master Plan for the Development of Ethnic Groups in Thailand 2015-2017 omitted the larger, ethnoregional ethnic communities, including the Central Thai majority; it therefore covers only 9.7% of the population.

There is a significant number of Thai-Chinese in Thailand. Chinese origins as evidenced by surname were erased in the 1920s by royal decree. Fourteen percent of Thais may have Chinese origins. One scholar estimated that the Sino-Thai population, itself around 14 per cent of the total, was composed of around 56 percent Teochew, 16 percent Hakka, 12 percent Hainanese, 7 percent Hokkien, 7 percent Cantonese and 2 percent other. Significant intermixing has taken place such that there are few pure ethnic Chinese, and those of partially mixed Chinese ancestry account for as much as a third to a half of the Thai population. Those assigned Thai ethnicity in the census process made up the vast majority of the population in 2010 (95.9 percent); two percent were Burmese, 1.3 percent other, and 0.9 percent unspecified. Thus, the ethnosocial and genetic makeup situation is very different from that which is reported or self-claimed.

The vast majority of the Isan people, one-third of Thailand's population, are of ethnic Lao with some belonging to the Khmer minority. They speak the Isan language. Additionally there have been more recent waves of immigration from Vietnam and Cambodia across porous borders due to wars and subsequent poverty over the last few decades, whose immigrants have tried to keep a low profile and blend in.

In more recent years the Isan people began mixing with the rest of the nation as urbanization and mobility increase. Myanmar's numerous ethnic wars between the army and tribes who speak more than 40 languages and control large fiefdoms or states, has led to waves of immigrants seeking refuge or work in Thailand. The makeup of Myanmar nationals is complex and includes, for example, people of Nepali ethnicity who escaped Nepal, entered Myanmar, and then emigrated to Thailand.

Following the 2014 Thai coup d'état, Thailand's Department of Employment released figures showing that 408,507 legal workers from Myanmar, Laos, and Cambodia worked in Thailand. An additional 1,630,279 Myanmar nationals of all ethnicities, 40,546 Laotians, and 153,683 Cambodians were without legal work authorization, but also worked and resided in Thailand. Some 180,000 Cambodians were said to have left Thailand post-coup due to crackdown rumors, indicating government figures were an under count. These statistics are merely a single snapshot and hardly authoritative as there is constant movement and much eluding of authority.

The language of the central Thai population is the educational and administrative language. Other dialects of Thai exist, most notably the Southern Thai language. Several other small Tai (not Thai) groups include the Shan, Lue, and Phu Thai.

Malay- and Yawi-speaking Muslims of the south are another significant minority group (2.3 percent), yet there are a substantial number of ethnic Malays who speak only Thai. Other groups include the Khmer; the Mon, who are substantially assimilated with the Thai, and the Vietnamese.

Smaller mountain-dwelling tribes, such as the Hmong and Mien, as well as the Karen, number about 788,024. Some 300,000 Hmong were to have received citizenship in 2010.

Thailand is also home to more than 200,000 foreigners—retirees, extended tourists, and workers from, for example, Europe, North America, and elsewhere.

Languages 

Thailand is dominated by languages of the Southwestern Tai family. Karen languages are spoken along the border with Burma, Khmer is spoken near Cambodia (and previously throughout central Thailand), and Malay in the south near Malaysia.

The Thai hill tribes speak numerous small languages, many Chinese retain varieties of Chinese, and there are half a dozen sign languages. Thailand has 73 living languages.

The following table shows first languages in Thailand with 400,000 or more speakers according to the Royal Thai Government's 2011 Country Report to the Committee Responsible for the International Convention on the Elimination of All Forms of Racial Discrimination.

The following table employs 2000 census data. Caution should be exercised with Thai census data on first language. In Thai censuses, the four largest Tai-Kadai languages of Thailand (in order, Central Thai, Isan (majority Lao), Kam Mueang, Pak Tai) are not provided as options for language or ethnic group. People declaring one of these as a first language, including Lao, are assigned to "Thai". This explains the disparity between the two tables. For instance, self-reporting as Lao has been prohibited, due to the prohibition of the Lao ethnonym in the context of describing Thai citizens for approximately one hundred years. This was due to the promotion of "Thai" national identity to cement Siamese claims over the Lao city-states of what is now northern and northeast Thailand following the 1893 Franco-Siamese War and subsequent threats posed by French Indochina to the Lao tributary states of Siam. The birth of a homogenizing Thai ethnocentric national identity sufficient to begin transforming Siam from an absolute monarchy into a modern nation-state was achieved by assimilating the Lao with this Thai "identity", equivalent to what is now known as the Tai–Kadai languages, under a "Greater Thai Empire", and can be traced back to at least 1902. This homogenization began affecting the Thai census from 1904 onwards. The 2011 UN report data is therefore more comprehensive and better differentiates between the large Tai-Kadai languages of Thailand. As a country submission to a UN convention ratified by Thailand, it is also arguably more authoritative.

Religion

Theravada Buddhism is the official religion of Thailand. 93.5 percent are estimated to be Buddhist; 5.4 percent Muslim; 1.1 percent  Christian; and 0.1 percent other or have no religion.

In addition to Malay and Yawi speaking Thai and other southerners who are Muslim, the Muslim Cham of Cambodia in recent years began a large scale influx into Thailand.  The government permits religious diversity, and other major religions are represented, though there is much social tension, especially in the Muslim south. Spirit worship and animism are widely practiced.

People with disabilities
According to Thailand's Social Development and Human Security Ministry, about 1.6 million Thais have some form of disability. That amounts to 2.4 percent of the population of 68 million. About half, 48 percent, are physically handicapped. Other disabilities include: hearing loss, 18 percent; visual impairment, 11 percent; mental disorder, seven percent; intellectually challenged, seven percent; autism, 0.54 percent.

Expatriates
The largest foreign community are the Burmese, followed by the Cambodians and Laotians.

, Thai government data showed that over 770,900 Cambodian migrants, meaning five percent of the total population of Cambodia, currently live in Thailand. Some NGOs estimate that the actual number may be up to one million.

Laotians are particularly numerous considering the small size of Laos' population, about seven million, due to the lack of a language barrier. The Chinese expatriate employee population in Thailand, mostly Bangkok, has doubled from 2011-2016, making it the largest foreign community in Thailand not originating in a neighbouring country. Chinese hold 13.3 percent of all work permits issued in Thailand, an increase of almost one-fifth since 2015. Japanese expats are on the decline, and now rank sixth, behind Chinese and British. One in every four foreigners working in Thailand formerly were Japanese, and the figure has now dropped slightly to 22.8 percent of the foreign workforce as of late-2016.

Foreign residents in Thailand, according to the 2010 Census. It was found that there were 2,581,141 of foreign origins, composing around 3.87 percent of Thailand's population. Migrants from Cambodia, Laos and Myanmar, the most prevalent, accounted for 1.8 million foreigners.

Research by Kasikorn Bank estimated that in 2016, there were 68,300 foreigners over 50 years old—the minimum age for a retirement visa—holding long-stay visas living in Thailand, a 9% increase over the preceding two years. In 2018, Thailand issued almost 80,000 retirement visas, an increase of 30% from 2014, with Britons accounting for the majority of the new visas.

In 2010 there were 27,357 Westerners living in the northeastern region, 90 percent living with Thai spouses, according to research by the College of Population Studies at Chulalongkorn University in 2017.

Vital statistics

Current vital statistics

Births and deaths

Life expectancy at birth 

Average life expectancy at birth of the total population.

Total fertility rate
Total fertility rate (TFR) in Thailand by region and year:

Total fertility rate (TFR) in Thailand by province as of 2010:

Population pyramids

Data (The World Bank)

Life expectancy at birth
total: 75 years (2017)
male: 71 years (2017)
female: 79 years (2017)

Mortality rate, under-5 (deaths per 1,000 live births)
12.2 deaths per 1,000 live births (2016)

Adolescent birth rate
44.6 births (births per 1,000 girls aged 15–19) (2015)

CIA World Factbook demographic statistics 
The following demographic statistics are from the CIA World Factbook, unless otherwise indicated.

Population
The population of Thailand is approximately 69.7 million people, with an annual growth rate of about 0.3 percent.  In addition to Thais, it includes ethnic Chinese, Malay, Lao, Burmese, Cambodians, and Indians, among others. The 2010 decennial census revealed a population of 65,981,600 (up from 60,916,441 in 2000). Post-census adjustments are being made to lower reporting errors.

Age structure
 0–14 years: 21.2 percent (male 7,104,776/female 6,781,453)
 15–64 years: 70.3 percent (male 22,763,274/female 23,304,793)
 65 years and over: 8.5 percent (male 2,516,721/female 3,022,281) (2008 est.)

 0–14 years: 19.9 percent  (male 6,779,723/female 6,466,625)
 15–64 years: 70.9 percent  (male 23,410,091/female 23,913,499)
 65 years and over: 9.2 percent (male 2,778,012/female 3,372,203) (2011 est.)

 0-14 years: 17.41 percent (male 6,062,868/female 5,774,631)
 15-24 years: 14.78 percent (male 5,119,387/female 4,927,250)
 25-54 years: 46.69 percent (male 15,675,425/female 16,061,864)
 55-64 years: 11.26 percent (male 3,600,695/female 4,053,977)
 65 years and over: 9.86 percent (male 2,935,703/female 3,764,605) (2015 est.)

According to the UN, the proportion of those over 65 will be 19.5 percent in 2030 and 25 percent by 2040.

National Statistical Office (NSO) figures for 2017 show that 17% (11.3 million) of the Thai population of 66.18 million persons are children under 15; 65.1% (43.09 million) are working age (16–59 years) adults; and 15.5% (10.22 million) are elderly (60+ years).

Population growth rate 
 0.615 percent (2009 est.)
 0.566 percent (2011 est.)

Net migration rate
0 migrants/1,000 population (2011 est.)

Sex ratio
 At birth: 1.06 males/female
 Under 15 years: 1.05 males/female
 15–64 years: 0.98 males/female
 65 years and over: 0.83 males/female
 Total population: 0.98 males/female (2009 est.)

Life expectancy at birth
 Total population: 73.6 years
 Male: 71.24 years
 Female: 76.08 years (2011 est.)

Ethnic groups

The CIA World Factbook lists Thai at 95.9 percent, Burmese 2 percent, others 1.3 percent, unspecified 0.9 percent. While 2 percent Burmese is accurate and reflects mainly illegal migrants, the Thai figure of 95.9 percent figures is not referenced and contradicts more detailed 2011 Royal Thai Government data which suggests ethnic Central Thai 34.1 percent, ethnic Lao 24.9 percent, ethnic Khon Muang 9.9 percent, ethnic Pak Tai 7.4 percent, ethnic Khmer 2.3 percent, ethnic Malay 1.5 percent.

Literacy
 Definition: age 15 and over can read and write
 Total population: 92.6 percent
 Male: 94.9 percent
 Female: 90.5 percent  (2002 est.)

References

External links
 World Bank: Thailand

 
Demographics of Asia